Baker Motor Vehicle Company was an American manufacturer of Brass Era electric automobiles in Cleveland, Ohio, from 1899 to 1914.

History

The first Baker vehicle was a two seater with a selling price of US$850. One was sold to Thomas Edison as his first car. Edison also designed the nickel-iron batteries used in some Baker electrics. These batteries have extremely long lives.

1902 accident 
In May 1902, Baker took part in a speed trial on a public road on Staten Island, New York. The vehicle was built specially for racing, having previously raced in Cleveland, and was a streamlined and enclosed 'torpedo' body with a small conning tower and even smaller mica window for the driver. A crew of two were carried, one acting as brakesman whilst W C Baker, the driver, steered. The intention was to exceed 60 mph and to cover 'a mile a minute' from a standing start, beating the performance of the more powerful gasoline cars and the 1901 electric record by a Riker of 1:08.

The Baker was car 39 from the start and set a good time for the first part of the course, but then lost control and slid sideways into the crowd. A number of spectators were injured and two killed. In the aftermath, the Automobile Club of America resolved to stop races on public roads and there was a general loss of confidence in the safety of electric cars.

Early production
The model range was expanded in 1904 to two vehicles, both two-seaters with armored wood-frames, centrally-located electric motors, and 12-cell batteries.

In 1906 Baker made 800 cars, making them the largest electric vehicle maker in the world at the time. They bragged that their new factory was "the largest in the world" in advertisements. The company also made a switch from producing Baker Electric Carriages to automobiles. According to the company promotionals; "We employ the choicest materials in every detail of their construction and finish, producing vehicles which in every minute particular, cannot be equaled for thorough excellence."

The 1906 Baker Landolet was priced at $4,000. The company also manufactured the Imperial, Suburban, Victoria, Surrey, Depot Carriages, and other new models "to be announced later." One of the most unusual 1906 Bakers was the Brougham with the driver on the outside, in the back.

By 1907, Baker had seventeen models, the smallest being the Stanhope and the largest the Inside Drive Coupe. There was also the US$4,000 Extension Front Brougham with the driving seat high up behind the passengers mimicking a hansom cab. Baker also introduced a range of trucks with capacity of up to five tons in 1907.

In late 1910, the Baker Electric was quite luxurious and priced at $2,800. It had a seating capacity of four passengers and was painted black with choice of blue, green or maroon panels. The latest model also offered a Queen Victoria body as "interchangeable on chassis" priced at an additional $300.

The Baker of 1910 was the only electric that had a heavy series-wound motor of 300 percent overload capacity, with a commutator "absolutely proof against sparking and burning under all conditions."

Special Baker Electrics 
 A Baker Electric was part of the first White House fleet of cars. It was driven by Helen Taft, wife of William Howard Taft, and later by Edith Bolling Wilson.
 A Baker Electric was bought in 1903 by King Chulalongkorn of Siam. It was trimmed with ivory and gold, and upholstered with pigskin seats.

Commercial vehicles

The Baker Motor-Vehicle Company, located at 63 West 80th Street in Cleveland, Ohio, specialized in vehicles for the commercial market. By October 1912, the company had a Commercial Car Department and had dealers situated in several leading cities around the United States.

During late 1912, Baker advertised that the average cost for deliveries over the "steep hills" of Spokane, Washington, by Crescent Department Store were four cents a piece, including all operating charges, maintenance, interest and depreciation.

By late 1913, the company advertised their new model as "The magnificent new Baker Coupe" and that the car was "just what the public demanded, a genuine automobile, not an electrically driven coach". That year, the car had "increased roominess, full limousine back, longer wheelbase, graceful, low-hung body lines, with both interior and exterior conveniences and appointments which have set a new mark in motor car refinement". Another new feature were revolving front seats which faced forward or "turn about".

Merger

In 1913, Baker was overtaken in sales by Detroit Electric and, in 1914, merged with fellow Cleveland automaker Rauch and Lang to become Baker, Rauch & Lang. The last Baker cars were made in 1916, but electric industrial trucks continued for a few more years. Baker, Rauch & Lang produced the Owen Magnetic under contract.

Founder Walter C. Baker's Torpedo land speed record racer was the first car to have seat belts.

Walter Baker joined the board of Peerless Motor Company in 1919.

Advertisements

In popular culture
A 1916 Baker Electric featured in a 1959 episode of Peter Gunn entitled "Love Me to Death".

See also
 List of automobile manufacturers
 List of car brands
 History of the electric vehicle
 Search for the Super Battery (2017 PBS film)

References

Further reading

 Jay Leno, "The 100-Year-Old Electric Car", Popular Mechanics, May 1, 2007
 Frank Leslie's Popular Monthly (January, 1904)
 David Burgess Wise, The New Illustrated Encyclopedia of Automobiles

External links

 Baker Electric Vehicles (1907) - Sales catalog featuring specifications and pricing for various models at Cleveland Public Library.
 My Classic Car Season 10 Episode 14 - Jay Leno's Baker Electric Car
 Blog about Old Rhinebeck Aerodrome's Baker electric car restoration

Motor vehicle manufacturers based in Ohio
Defunct motor vehicle manufacturers of the United States
Electric vehicles introduced in the 20th century
1900s cars
1910s cars
Brass Era vehicles
Veteran vehicles
American companies established in 1899
Vehicle manufacturing companies established in 1899
Vehicle manufacturing companies disestablished in 1914
1899 establishments in Ohio
1914 disestablishments in Ohio
Defunct companies based in Cleveland
1914 mergers and acquisitions